Bromhead may refer to:

Places
 Bromhead, Saskatchewan, a village in Saskatchewan, Canada
 Bromhead (electoral district), a former provincial electoral district in Saskatchewan, Canada

People with the surname Bromhead:
 Sir Edward Bromhead, 2nd Baronet (1789–1855), mathematician
 Gonville Bromhead (1845–1892), British Victoria Cross recipient, nephew of the above
 Henry de Bromhead, Irish racehorse trainer
 Bromhead baronets
 Peter Bromhead, New Zealand cartoonist
 Stephen Bromhead (c. 1957–2023), Australian politician

Other
 Bromheads Jacket